Cuy-Saint-Fiacre is a commune in the Seine-Maritime department in the Normandy region in north-western France.

Geography

Population

Places of interest
 The war memorial, designed by François Pompon.
 The church of St. Martin, dating from the twelfth century.
 Remains of a monastery and chateau, both  now parts of farms.
 A sixteenth-century stone cross.

See also
 Communes of the Seine-Maritime department

References

Communes of Seine-Maritime